Hilda Lilian Fenemore (22 April 1914 – 13 April 2004) was an English actress with a prolific career in film and television from the 1940s to the 1990s. Fenemore played mainly supporting roles which were characterised in her obituary in The Stage as "friends, neighbours, mothers and passers-by"; however, her many credits meant that she fell into the category of actresses who a majority of film and TV viewers would have been unable to name, yet whose face was instantly recognisable. Her longest-running role was recurring character Jennie Wren in TV series Dixon of Dock Green, who she played for six series between 1960 and 1965.

Career
Fenemore began her career as a stage actress, joining the company of actors at London's left-wing and progressive Unity Theatre in the 1940s. There she met and married fellow actor Rex Edwards, and worked under the supervision of dramatist Ted Willis, with whom she would later work also in television.

Fenemore made her first film appearance in 1948, and the pattern of her screen career quickly established itself as she featured in a string of supporting parts, mainly in films financed by smaller independent studios rather than the major British set-ups of the day. She appeared in a number of productions financed by the non-profit making Children's Film Foundation, which specialised in adventure-type films made for children, of generally around an hour in length. These films were well regarded as they generally used proven actors and crews, had good production values, and were sophisticated enough to be enjoyed by adults as well as children. In the 1950s, Fenemore continued to work in live theatre, while also accepting work in television.

At the end of the 1950s, Fenemore appeared in two of the early Carry On films, notably in a memorable, albeit brief, cameo in Carry On Nurse (1959) as a wife visiting her husband in hospital, supremely oblivious to the absurdly snobbish impression of upper middle class gentility he has been trying to give his fellow patients, and blithely broadcasting embarrassingly working class trivia at full volume to the entire ward ("I bought this with our divi from the Co-op!") as he cringes in humiliation. In 1960 she was cast as Jennie Wren in Dixon of Dock Green, which reunited her with Willis as scriptwriter, and played the role for the next six years. 1961 brought one of Fenemore's more prominent screen credits, portraying the matriarch of the family at the centre of The Wind of Change, one of the first British films to confront the issue of contemporary race relations.

Through the 1960s and into the 1970s, Fenemore's career increasingly turned to television. She featured in recurring roles in comedy series The Fenn Street Gang (as Mrs. Duffy) and Are You Being Served? (as a cleaner, variously referred to as Ivy, Elsie or Daphne but presumed to be the same person). She also starred in the cult favourite CFF production Chico the Rainmaker, originally shown as a serial during children's Saturday cinema matinees in the UK, and later on PBS in the United States. Fenemore's two final screen credits came in 1978 in the thriller Absolution and as the mother of Oliver Tobias in camp favourite The Stud.

Fenemore's television career continued until the early 1990s, with her last significant appearances in 1992 comedy-drama Going to Seed. According to The Stage, she continued with radio voiceover work almost up to her death. Fenemore died on 13 April 2004, aged 89.
She is buried in East London Cemetery.

Filmography (partial)

 Esther Waters (1948) – Undetermined Minor Role (uncredited)
 The Astonished Heart (1950) – Railway Station Announcer (voice, uncredited)
 Chance of a Lifetime (1950) – Worker
 Saturday Island (1952) – Nurse
 Time Bomb (1953) – Jimmy's Mother (uncredited)
 The Titfield Thunderbolt (1953) – Lady Washing Baby (uncredited)
 Turn the Key Softly (1953) – Granny's Daughter (uncredited)
 The Large Rope (1953) - Pub Landlady (uncredited)
 Adventure in the Hopfields (1954) – Mrs. Quin
 The End of the Road (1954)
 Room in the House (1955)
 Johnny, You're Wanted (1956)
 The Secret Place (1957) – Mrs. Haywood's Neighbour (uncredited)
 The Tommy Steele Story (1957) – Mrs.Steele
 The Strange World of Planet X (1958) – Mrs. Hale 
 The Safecracker (1958) – Mrs. McCullers
 Innocent Sinners (1958) – Cassie
 The Young and the Guilty (1958) – Maude Marshall
 Carry On Nurse (1959) – Mrs. Rhoda Bray
 Carry On Constable (1960) – Agitated Woman
 Feet of Clay (1961) – Mrs. Clarke
 The Wind of Change (1961) – Gladys Marley
 Strongroom (1962) – Charlady
 The Boys (1962) – Mrs. Thompson
 The War Lover (1962) – Pub Landlady (uncredited)
 Doctor in Distress (1963) – Railway Station Barmaid (uncredited)
 This Is My Street (1964) – Doris
 Witchcraft (1964) – Nurse
 A Jolly Bad Fellow (1964) – Secretary to Dr. Brass
 Clash by Night (1964) – Mrs. Peel
 The Offence (1972) – Woman on Common
 I Want What I Want (1972) – (uncredited)
 The Bawdy Adventures of Tom Jones (1976) – Mrs. Belcher
 Full Circle (1977) – Katherine 
 The Stud (1978) – Tony's mother
 Absolution (1978) – Mrs. Hoskins

Television (selected)
 Sunday Night Theatre (1952–1956) – 1st Nanny / Mrs. Parsons / Mrs. Whitelaw / Mrs. Pengard / Winnie / Daisy
 Dixon of Dock Green (1955–1965) – Various characters
 Emergency - Ward 10 (1959)
 No Hiding Place (1960–1961) – Mrs. Welch / Mrs. Williamson
 Sergeant Cork (1963) – Nellie
 Thorndyke (1964) – Mrs. Brattle
 Adam Adamant Lives! (1967) – Mrs. Clasp
 Z-Cars (1967–1971) – Mrs. Bennett / Connie Hughes / Mrs. Carter
 The Fenn Street Gang (1971–73) – Mrs. Duffy
'Justice (1971) Mrs Palmer
 Chico the Rainmaker (1972)
 Emma (1972) – Mrs. Cole
 Are You Being Served? (1974–1979) – Daphne Ackroyd / Ivy
 Dad's Army (1975) – Queenie Beal
 The Duchess of Duke Street (1976) – Mrs. Parker
 It Ain't Half Hot Mum (1980) – Mrs. Parkins
 Together (1980) – Dora Klein
 Goodnight Sweetheart (1993) – Old Lady
 Harry Enfield and Chums (1994) – Old Lady at Bus Stop (final appearance)

References

External links

Hilda Fenemore at BFI Film & TV Database

1914 births
2004 deaths
English film actresses
English television actresses
Actresses from London
People from St Pancras, London